Cuba competed at the 2022 World Games held in Birmingham, United States from 7 to 17 July 2022.

Competitors
The following is the list of number of competitors in the Games.

Road speed skating

Adriana Cantillo Tundidor was scheduled to compete in the women's 1 lap and women's 100 metres sprint events. She did not start in either event.

Track speed skating

Adriana Cantillo Tundidor competed in track speed skating.

References

Nations at the 2022 World Games
World Games
World Games